Jimmy Daly (born 30 November 1904, date of death unknown) was an Irish football player born in Dublin who played primarily as a right-back.

He joined Shamrock Rovers in 1931 and in his first season helped Rovers win the League, the FAI Cup and the Shield. On 21 May 1932 he departed for Aberdeen F.C. of the Scottish Division One. On August 17, 1932 Daly made his debut for the Dons in a 7-1 win over East Stirlingshire in the Dewar Shield at Pittodrie. He would ultimately make only four appearances for Aberdeen before being sold back to Shamrock Rovers on 8 December 1932.

He won two senior caps for the Irish Free State making his debut in a 2-0 friendly win against the Netherlands on 8 May 1932. His other cap came in a 1-0 friendly loss against Switzerland in Basle on 5 May 1935.

He scored twice in the 1933 FAI Cup replay win.

Honours
League of Ireland: 1
  Shamrock Rovers - 1931–32
FAI Cup: 2
  Shamrock Rovers - 1932, 1933
League of Ireland Shield: 1
  Shamrock Rovers - 1931-32
Leinster Senior Cup: 1
  Shamrock Rovers - 1933
LFA President's Cup: 1
  Shamrock Rovers - 1933-34

References
 The Hoops by Paul Doolan and Robert Goggins
 

Association footballers from County Dublin
Republic of Ireland association footballers
Irish Free State international footballers
Shamrock Rovers F.C. players
Aberdeen F.C. players
League of Ireland players
Scottish Football League players
1904 births
Year of death missing
Irish Free State association footballers
Association football defenders
Irish expatriate association footballers
Irish expatriate sportspeople in Scotland
Expatriate footballers in Scotland